The 1988 Great Britain Lions tour was the Great Britain national rugby league team's 18th tour of Australasia and took place from May to July 1988. It started with a Test match against Papua New Guinea before the best-of-three series against Australia for the Ashes title, and finally a Test against New Zealand. Some of these matches counted toward the ongoing 1985–1988 World Cup tournament. An additional 13 matches were played against local club and representative sides from each host nation.

Background 
The tour took place after Britain's 1987–88 Rugby Football League season. A 16-man British press party - the largest ever - accompanied the team through Papua New Guinea, Australia and New Zealand.

Touring squad 
Mal Reilly was the British team's coach. The assistant coach was British Amateur Rugby League Association (BARLA) and RFL Coaching Director Phil Larder. The tour manager was Les Bettinson. The touring side's captain was Ellery Hanley, who was signed by Sydney club the Balmain Tigers to play the remaining rounds of the 1988 NSWRFL season once his representative commitments were fulfilled. It was also announced during the tour that Kevin Ward, who had played in Manly-Warringah's 1987 premiership winning team, would rejoin the Sea Eagles for the remainder of their season once the tour was completed.

An initial 23-man squad for the tour was selected in April 1988, with an additional three players to be selected from a "train-on" squad. Andy Goodway withdrew from the tour due to "business commitments", and was replaced by Roy Haggerty. Des Drummond was removed from the squad after allegedly punching a spectator who rushed onto the pitch shouting racial abuse during the British season. Carl Gibson was selected as his replacement. Steve Hampson withdrew due to injury, and Joe Lydon was dropped for allegedly assaulting a spectator.

Papua New Guinea 
The Lions played only two games in Papua New Guinea, winning both of them.

The result of this match counted towards the 1985–1988 World Cup tournament, the final of which was to be played later in the year. The first Test of the tour was played in 38 degree heat with fans clustered in trees and clinging to lights around the ground. 21-year-old Shaun Edwards, the youngest member of the touring party, damaged his knee after six minutes of the match and it was feared that he would miss the rest of the tour. By half time Great Britain were leading 28–6. Garry Schofield scored his 17th try in 18 Test matches for Great Britain, and captain Ellery Hanley made three try-saving tackles.

After the match Edwards was flown to Sydney to undergo surgery on his knee's cartilage due to the injury he sustained while playing in this match.

Australia 
The Australian leg of the tour took place in the midst of the 1988 NSWRFL season as well as the 1988 State of Origin series. In 1988 Australia was also celebrating its national bicentenary. The tour's itinerary, which involved short periods between matches, making it tough for the visitors, was designed by the Australian Rugby League but agreed to by the British.

The Ashes series attracted just 67,554 to the three tests, with the dead rubber third game attracting just 15,944 to the Sydney Football Stadium. The second Ashes test against Australia at Lang Park in Brisbane drew the tours highest attendance of 27,130 while the game against reigning Sydney premiers Manly-Warringah attracted the highest non-test attendance of the tour with 21,131. The total Ashes series attendance was 7,926 less than had attended the 1984 series played in Australia and was 34,006 less than the record breaking series played in England during the 1986 Kangaroo Tour. It was also easily the lowest ever attended Ashes series played in Australia since 1910 which attracted 60,000 fans.

Test Venues 
The three Ashes series tests took place at the following venues. Two games were played in Sydney.

North Queensland: Namok, Gagai, Taylor, Turia, Curry, Worth, Filosi, Colwell, Bax, McAskill, House, Dalley, Greenwood. Res - Ernest, Conlan

Great Britain: Phil Ford, Paul Medley, Carl Gibson, David Stephenson, Martin Offiah, David Hulme, Mike Ford, Brian Case, Paul Groves, Roy Powell, Karl Fairbank, Paul Dixon, Andy Platt (c). Res - Roy Haggerty

The Newcastle Knights, a new team in the NSWRL Premiership in 1988, was rewarded for large early season attendances with a game against the touring Lions.

The Northern Division side, captained by former NSW, South Sydney and Eastern Suburbs five-eighth Rocky Laurie, gave the tourists their first defeat, and a heavy defeat at that. Also playing for Northern Division was future NSWRL Rothmans Medal winner with Canterbury-Bankstown, Moree Boomerangs  Ewan McGrady who crossed for two tries and future Canterbury premiership winning centre Matthew Ryan. The game became known as "Black Sunday" for the Lions who went down 36-12. According to media reports, after the game Mal Reilly locked his team in the dressing room and upbraided them for 20 minutes before the media were allowed in.

Although facing the Lions mid-week side which still included test players Andy Platt, Martin Offiah, Phil Ford, Carl Gibson, David Hulme and Roy Powell, Manly went into the game missing regular first grade players Paul Vautin, Michael O'Connor, Phil Daley (Australian test players rested before the first test four days later), while fullback Dale Shearer, winger David Ronson and goal kicking hooker Mal Cochrane were unavailable due to injury. In the absence of Vautin, the defending Winfield Cup premiers were captained by 1986 Kangaroo Tourist and 10 test veteran Noel Cleal who had a point to prove after being a shock omission from the Australian and NSW sides (the Lions camp and the English media following the team was reportedly dumbfounded at Cleal's non-selection). In front of a vocal Brookvale Oval crowd of 21,131, the largest non-test attendance of the tour, the makeshift Sea Eagles side put the tourists to the sword, running out five tries to nil winners. Manly's teenage halfback Geoff Toovey, playing only his third game of top grade football, capped a man-of-the-match performance scoring one of his sides tries. The match saw the first time that former test rivals and teammates in Manly's 1972 and 1973 premiership wins Bob Fulton (Manly) and Mal Reilly (Great Britain) would coach against each other.

For the Lions, their captain on the night Andy Platt was far and away their best player with the rest showing little form heading into the first test just 4 days later. After Cliff Lyons crossed for Manly's 5th try in just 60th minute, the game descended into a scrappy contest as fatigue and high frustrations for the Lions resulted in Mark Brokenshire (Manly) and Roy Haggerty (GB) each getting 10 minutes in the sin-bin for foul play. For Manly, Toovey, Lyons, Cleal and Des Hasler (playing at lock) led the way for the 30–0 win.

The game was refereed by Frenchman Francis Desplas who would be the referee for all three tests of the Ashes series. Although not playing the game, Mal Reilly allowed Lions prop forward Kevin Ward who had played in Manly's 1987 Grand Final winning team (and would again link with Manly once the tour ended), to take the toss of the coin in front of his 'home' fans despite Andy Platt captaining the side. The scheduling of the game against the reigning Sydney premiers only four days out from the first test drew criticism from Lions management and the British press who were covering the tour.

1st Ashes Test 
The Ashes series was styled the 'Winfield Test series' due to sponsorship from Winfield cigarettes. The first game was the 100th rugby league test between the two sides. Andrew Ettingshausen, Peter Jackson, Tony Currie, Sam Backo, Phil Daley and Gary Belcher were selected to make their Test match debuts for Australia. Largely thanks to their 3-0 domination of the State of Origin series, Queensland players dominated in the Australian forward pack with Manly's Phil Daley the only NSW player in the starting six. Both Blues skipper Wayne Pearce and Noel Cleal were shock omissions while Wally Fullerton-Smith (second row) and Greg Conescu (hooker) were recalled for their first tests since 1984 and 1985 respectively. The absence through injury of several of Great Britain's Test stars meant that several members of their team were playing out of position.

Following heavy losses to Northern Division and Manly-Warringah in their two games immediately prior to the first test, one unnamed ARL official allegedly remarked that trying to promote a test series with the Great Britain side (who had not won a test against Australia since the second test of the 1978 Kangaroo Tour) was like trying to flog a dead horse. Indeed, this was reflected when only 24,480 attended the first test at the Sydney Football Stadium, with the dead rubber third test at the venue only attracting 15,944 fans, the lowest ever test attendance between the two teams in Sydney.

Following a high tackle on British hooker Kevin Beardmore by Australian front rower Phil Daley, Great Britain put the first points on the board with Paul Loughlin's penalty kick from 40 metres out. The first try also went to the visitors with Ellery Hanley beating several defenders to score in the corner. Great Britain looked the better team in the first half and were leading 6–0 at the break.

After six minutes of the second-half Sam Backo ran on to a Peter Sterling pass to score Australia's first try, although there was doubt around the ball's grounding. Peter Jackson scored two tries over 11 minutes to give Australia victory. In between these two tries Wally Lewis kicked a field goal.

John MacDonald of The Sydney Morning Herald reported that the tourists were not only competitive, but a little unlucky, and that the 17–6 score did not reflect how close they came to winning. He also leveled heavy criticism at the refereeing performance of Francois Desplas, who could not speak English. As man-of-the-match, British forward Kevin Ward received $1,000.

Great Britain's second-row forward Andy Platt received an injury to his left arm that was expected to see him sidelined for the next two weeks.

Combined Brisbane: Steve Hegarty, Kelly Egan, Brett McCarthy, Cherry, Gordon Barwick, Peter Coyne, Daunt, McIntyre, Holmes, Ponting, Glen Haggath, Ian Stains, Darren Smith. Res - Kevin Langer, White

Great Britain: Phil Ford, Henderson Gill, Garry Schofield, Carl Gibson, Ellery Hanley (c), Mike Ford, Brian Case, Paul Groves, Lee Crooks, Roy Powell, Karl Fairbank, Paul Dixon. Res - Martin Offiah, Hugh Waddell

In the 20th minute of the match British centre Garry Schofield was assisted from the field with a fractured jaw bone.

Central Queensland: Crow, Miller, Peter White, Paul White, Hinricks, Iles, Upkett, Olsson, Emmert, Weinert, Leisha, Duff, Brazier.

Great Britain: Paul Loughlin, Carl Gibson, Ian Wilkinson, Darren Wright, Martin Offiah, Ellery Hanley (c), David Hulme, Kevin Ward, Kevin Beardmore, Hugh Waddell, Roy Powell, Karl Fairbank, Roy Haggerty. Res - Lee Crooks, Henderson Gill

British prop Lee Crooks injured his shoulder in this match putting him in doubt for the remainder of the Ashes series. Winning the scrums 11-2, Great Britain had a wealth of possession and exploited it ruthlessly. The Capras' only try came from Black Water Devils second-rower Marshall Leisha during the last ten minutes.

Toowoomba / S-E Queensland: Weribone, Clevin, Blake, Pratt, Stower, Clancy, Smith, Dwyer, M. Cook, Sutoon, Buckle, Johnson, Sullivan. Res - Terry Cook, Neale

Great Britain: Paul Loughlin, Henderson Gill, David Stephenson, Phil Ford, Martin Offiah, Ellery Hanley (c), David Hulme, Kevin Ward, Kevin Beardmore, Paul Dixon, Karl Fairbank, Roy Powell, Mike Gregory.

Wide Bay: Ovens, Templeman, Kirby, Lalli, Kinsela, Jones, Ward, Reddacliff, Gerrard, McGrath, Sempf, Schulte, March. Res - Graving, Ryan

Great Britain: Ian Wilkinson, Carl Gibson, Andy Currier, Darren Wright, Henderson Gill, Mike Ford, Paul Hulme, Brian Case, Paul Groves, Hugh Waddell, Roy Powell, Karl Fairbank, Roy Haggerty. Res - Paul Loughlin, Martin Offiah

2nd Ashes Test 
The Australian's made two changes to the side that won the first test in Sydney. Wayne Pearce earned a recall at lock with Bob Lindner moving to the bench in place of Steve Folkes. Injuries again forced Mal Reilly into changing his side for the second test. Garry Schofield's broken jaw saw Phil Ford moved to the centres with Henderson Gill recalled onto the wing. Captain Ellery Hanley moved from lock to the centres in place of David Stephenson with Mike Gregory coming in at lock forward. Andy Platt dropped from the front row to the back row with Roy Powell coming into prop. Darren Wright and Paul Hulme were the new players on the bench.

Match commentary was provided by Darrell Eastlake and supercoach Jack Gibson.

On Lang Park's electronic scoreboard the message "Bullfrog - shame our favourite No 7 isn't here" was displayed in a reference to Queensland halfback Allan Langer being overlooked for selection by Kangaroos team manager Peter Moore in favour of Peter Sterling.

The tourists got first points with a penalty kick. After playing the ball three quarters of the way towards Great Britain's line Australians moved the ball through the hands out to left centre Michael O'Connor who broke through the defence and scored the first try. Australia's next try came in the twentieth minute when Wally Lewis chip kicked the ball ahead for himself, re-gathered it and passed it Peter Jackson who crossed untouched and scored behind the uprights. O'Connor successfully converted his try taking the score to 14–4 in favour of the hosts. After playing the ball around mid field the Australians kept the ball alive with a total of nine passes, the last of which was to Andrew Ettingshausen on the right wing who beat Martin Offiah to dive over in the corner. O'Connor's conversion attempt hit the upright so the half time score remained at 18–4.

After the break Great Britain were playing the ball within their own half of the field when Ellery Hanley got it at first receiver and ran himself, splitting the defence and racing into Australia's half where he passed to Ford who ran the remaining forty metres to score beneath the uprights. Sam Backo then scored a close range try, running from dummy-half and forcing his way over the line. Again playing the ball close to Great Britain's line Australia scored from dummy half once more when Wayne Pearce dived over. Playing the ball just inside Great Britain's half the Australians continued up-field, evading tacklers and passing to support players, the last of whom was Wally Lewis who ran the remaining metres to score untouched. Five minutes from full-time Andy Gregory was sent to the sin-bin for 10 minutes—effectively for the remainder of the game—after another high tackle on Ettingshausen.

By winning this match Australia successfully defended their Ashes title. The Poms' excessive aggression was seen as costing them the match. Criticism of French referee Desplas also continued.

Western Division: Frail, Wilfred Williams, Casey, Mark Smith, Newman, Clark, Douglas, Gibson, Luke, McAnally, Fitzgerald, Michael Peachy, Moy. Res - Stammers, Batty

Great Britain: Ian Wilkinson, Carl Gibson, Andy Currier, Darren Wright, Martin Offiah, Ellery Hanley (c), Mike Ford, Brian Case, Paul Groves, Hugh Waddell, Karl Fairbank, Paul Hulme, Mike Gregory.

With Great Britain leading 26–10 with 20 minutes to go, the local forwards rallied strongly to give the Lions a fright.

After playing the entire tour using the international numbers for the forwards (i.e. props with 8 and 10, loose forward with 13), Great Britain used the old standard still used in Australia until the end of the year with the props in 11 and 13, loose forward with 8.

The Don Furner coached President's XIII led 14–2 after 22 minutes thanks to tries by Steve O'Brien, Glenn Lazarus and 1986 Kangaroo tourist Greg Alexander. But after a second half try to Mal Meninga (who had an off day with the boot, kicking only 2 of his 6 attempts at goal), the Lions brought it back to 18–16 thanks to 2 tries from Welsh fullback Phil Ford and one to captain Mike Gregory plus the more accurate goal kicking of St Helens centre Paul Loughlin in the increasingly muddy conditions at the Seiffert Oval, the home ground of the Canberra Raiders. However, a late try to Penrith centre Graeme Bradley put the game beyond the reach of the tourists. South Sydney's Mario Fenech, playing at hooker, was given the honour of captaining the President's XIII.

3rd Ashes Test 
This match also counted toward the result of the 1985–1988 World Cup tournament. Australia were considered favourites, having won the past fifteen consecutive test matches. Great Britain's chances were also lessened by the squad missing the likes of Shaun Edwards, Kevin Beardmore, Steve Hampson, Andy Platt, Garry Schofield, Joe Lydon, Lee Crooks and Andy Goodway for one reason or another, and some players taking to the field not fully fit. It was the debut of Paul Hulme and Hugh Waddell in the front row.
The match was broadcast by the Nine network with commentary from Darrell Eastlake and Jack Gibson.

Early in the match Great Britain were disallowed a try when Henderson Gill dived onto an Andy Gregory bomb which was not secured by the Australian fullback. The Kangaroos then had chances to score at the other end of the field, but the British defence held strong. The first try of the match would go to the visitors when, playing the ball inside Australia's twenty-two, they strung some passes together, getting the ball out to Martin Offiah who dove over the line on the right wing. The conversion attempt was missed so the score was 0–4 with over three quarters of the match still to be played. A few minutes later Great Britain were again on the attack in Australia's territory and keeping the ball alive, their scrum half back Andy Gregory darting about elusively before passing it to Ford who stepped and weaved his way amongst the defenders to dash through and score near the uprights. The conversion was successful, giving Great Britain a 0–10 lead. Shortly before half-time Australia suffered a major setback when their halfback Peter Sterling was forced off with a dislocated shoulder after being driven into the turf in a tackle by Roy Powell. No more points were scored in the first half, so this was the score at the break.

Australia scored first in the second half after winning a scrum against the feed within Great Britain's twenty-two. Working the ball up close to the uprights, their captain Wally Lewis got it at first receiver and ran it into the defence, wrestling his way through to the tryline where he reached out and put it down beneath the black dot. The try was successfully converted, so the score was 6–10 in favour of the Lions. Great Britain then extended their lead after working the ball up into an attacking position where Andy Gregory chipped it ahead. In the rush of chasers from both sides trying to reach the ball it was knocked ahead into the in-goal area where Henderson Gill dived on it. The kick was successful so the British were leading 6–16. Again the Britons' failure to win a scrum in their own territory afforded Australia another opportunity, with forward Sam Backo crashing over the line shortly after from close range. The successful kick brought the Kangaroos back to within an unconverted try at 12–16. The Lions struck again from deep within their own half where centre Paul Loughlin got the ball at first receiver, ran through the defensive line and crossed half-way before passing to Henderson Gill in support on his outside to dive over on the right wing. The conversion attempt was missed, so the British lead was 12–20. Then they scored another long range try while working the ball away from their own line, Andy Gregory making a dart from dummy half, catching the markers napping and getting into open space. He then found Mike Gregory in support who ran about seventy metres to dive over under the posts. The easy kick meant a 26–12 lead for Great Britain and this is where the scoreboard remained at full-time.

Australian front row forward Sam Backo scored a try in all three tests. This saw him join legendary winger Ken Irvine (1963) as the only Australians to score a try in each test of an Ashes series.

This was the end of a 15-match winning streak for the Australians, and Great Britain's first Test victory over the Kangaroos since their 18–14 win at Odsal Stadium during the 1978 Kangaroo tour, as well as their first win in Australia for 18 years. It also put Great Britain on top of the World Cup points table.

After the match there was a gala dinner at the Regent Hotel.

New Zealand 

The Lions lost two of three of their matches in New Zealand.

Test Match 
The result of this match would determine who would contest the final of the 1985–1988 World Cup tournament's final to be played later in the year.

It was a rainy afternoon in Christchurch. Following the national anthems "God Save the Queen" and "God Defend New Zealand", and a haka by the Kiwis, Great Britain kicked off. In slippery conditions New Zealand knocked during the first set of six. This resulted in a scrum to the visitors deep inside the Kiwis' territory. From the scrum win the ball was moved out to the left where a pass was knocked down by a New Zealand defender but re-gathered by British centre Paul Loughlin who dived over the line. The referee awarded the try which Loughlin failed to convert, so Great Britain got out to an early 4 nil lead. A few minutes later a penalty was awarded to the Lions but Loughlin's kick was again wide. Shortly after that New Zealand were awarded a penalty and Peter Brown kicked it successfully, bringing the margin back to two points at 2–4.

Great Britain captain Ellery Hanley sustained a cut under his eye during the match which required 12 stitches.

Notes

References

Great Britain national rugby league team tours
Rugby league tours of Australia
Australia–United Kingdom relations
New Zealand–United Kingdom relations
Papua New Guinea–United Kingdom relations
Great Britain Lions tour
Great Britain Lions tour
Great Britain Lions tour
Great Britain Lions tour
Rugby league tours of New Zealand
Rugby league tours of Papua New Guinea